There is a long history of television and film in New Jersey, which is considered the birthplace of the movie picture industry.

The roots of the industry started in Newark with Hannibal Goodwin's patent of nitrocellulose film in 1887. Motion picture technology was invented by Thomas Edison, with early work done at his West Orange laboratory. Edison's Black Maria, where the first motion picture to be copyrighted in the United States, Fred Ott's Sneeze, was shot. The Centaur Film Company of Bayonne was the first independent movie studio in the USA. America's first motion picture industry started in 1907 in Fort Lee and the first studio was constructed there in 1909. Fred Wesley Wentworth was commissioned in 1914 by Jacob Fabian to build the Regent in Paterson, the first facility built exclusively for the exhibition of moving pictures. The nation's first drive-in theater opened at Airport Circle in 1933.

DuMont Laboratories in Passaic, developed early sets and made the first broadcast to the private home.

Many television shows and motion picture films have been filmed in New Jersey, which since 1978 maintains a Motion Picture and Television Commission.

Tax credits
New Jersey has long held an attraction for producers, both for its locations and the tax credits offered by the state. Governor Christopher Christie suspended the credits in 2010, but the New Jersey State Legislature in 2011 approved the restoration and expansion of the tax credit program. Under bills passed by both the state Senate and Assembly, the program would offer 20 percent tax credits (22% in urban enterprise zones) to television and film productions that shoot in the state and meet set standards for hiring and local spending. The tax credit is lower than that of other states offering similar incentives. A controversy arose in 2011, when the governor threatened to veto the payment of tax rebates to the production company of Jersey Shore, a program he and others felt negatively portrayed New Jersey. As of 2014, a bill is under consideration in the Senate is that would extend the program and remove any caps on tax credits.

When Governor Phil Murphy took office, he instated the New Jersey Film & Digital Media Tax Credit Program in 2018 and expanded it in 2020. The benefits include a 30% tax credit on film projects and a 40% subsidy for studio developments.

Networks based in New Jersey

NJ PBS (known as NJTV until 2021) is a statewide public television network owned by the New Jersey Public Broadcasting Authority and operated by Public Media NJ, a subsidiary of The WNET Group.
The New Jersey Network (NJN) operated public television until June 30, 2011, when it ended operations and its television stations were transferred to WNET.
 Cable network CNBC originates most of its in-studio programming from Englewood Cliffs. Sister news network MSNBC broadcast from studios in Secaucus from 1997 until late 2007, when the network moved to Rockefeller Center's GE Building in a cost-cutting measure by parent company NBC Universal.
 The MLB Network moved into the former MSNBC studios in Secaucus in 2009.
 MyNetworkTV flagship station WWOR-TV (Channel 9) is licensed to and broadcasts from Secaucus; former owner RKO General moved the New York-based station across the Hudson in 1983 in an unsuccessful attempt to retain the station's license.
 WNET is licensed to Newark

Cable and Satellite
 CNBC
 MLB Network
 NBA TV
 News 12 New Jersey
 NHL Network

VHF stations (digital)
 Channel 8: WNJB - (PBS) "NJ PBS"
 Channel 9: WWOR-TV - (My Network TV) - Secaucus
 Channel 13: WNET - (PBS) - Newark
UHF stations (digital)
 Channel 33: WJLP - (MeTV) - Middletown Township (transmits on channel 3, but mapped to channel 33 on FCC order)
 Channel 34: WPXO-LD (low power) - (América Tevé) - East Orange
 Channel 39: WDVB-CA - (Independent) - Edison
 Channel 41: WXTV-DT - (Univision) - Paterson
 Channel 47: WNJU - (Telemundo) - Linden
 Channel 50: WNJN - (PBS) "NJ PBS"
 Channel 58: WNJB - (PBS) "NJ PBS"
 Channel 63: WMBC-TV - (Independent) - Newton
 Channel 68: WFUT-DT - (UniMás) - Newark

Television shows filmed in or set in New Jersey

 The Street "The first television series to be shot entirely in New Jersey..."
 Bar Karma
 Cartoon Network's Adult Swim cartoon Aqua Teen Hunger Force and Toonami cartoon Megas XLR are both set in New Jersey.
 FOX's animated sitcom Bobs Burgers is said to take place in the fictional town of Seymour's Bay, New Jersey, as indicated by several clues. Most notably that Linda has a stereotypical Jersey accent and New Jersey license plates are seen on several vehicles throughout the show.
 The opening of the NBC comedy Ed was filmed in Hillsdale and Westfield, New Jersey.
 In the animated television comedy Futurama, New Jersey is slandered many times by the characters. In one episode, Fry finds a seemingly ideal apartment while house hunting, but later comments, upon finding out that the home is located in New Jersey, that he found "not one place even remotely liveable". In another, when discussing the global garbage problem, a television ad states that "... landfills were full ... New Jersey was full ...", implying a lack of places to store garbage. Additionally, Robot Hell is located in Atlantic City.
 The Fox show Point Pleasant was based on a fictional version of the town. (It was not shot on location within the actual town of the same name.)
 The Bravo TV series Real Housewives of New Jersey is a reality show based on the daily lives of five New Jersey women living in Franklin Lakes.
 The television drama The Sopranos depicts the life of a New Jersey organized crime family and is filmed on location at various places throughout the state. Series creator and writer-director David Chase grew up in Clifton and North Caldwell.
 The Disney Channel Original Series Jonas is taken place in New Jersey on a fictional J.O.N.A.S. street.
 The HBO series Boardwalk Empire, a historical drama set during the prohibition era, takes place in Atlantic City, New Jersey.
 The HBO prison drama Oz was filmed in an old warehouse in Bayonne, with much of the series filmed around the now-defunct Military Ocean Terminal Base. 
 The NBC drama Law and Order: Special Victims Unit filmed police station and courtroom scenes at NBC's Central Archives building in North Bergen, and filmed other scenes throughout the county, such as a 2010 episode filmed at the Meadowlands Parkway in Secaucus. 
 The television medical drama House is set in New Jersey and takes place at the fictional Princeton Plainsboro Teaching Hospital. Overhead images of the building are actually the Frist Campus Center at Princeton University.
 In his comedy special What Am I Doing in New Jersey?, filmed at the Park Theater, George Carlin comments that he believes New Jersey deserves the title "Toll Booth Capital of the United States of America". He also suggests changing the state nickname from "The Garden State" to "The Toll Booth State".
 The NBC show Ed was based in the fictional town of Stuckeyville, Ohio, but filmed in various locations in New Jersey. Stuckeybowl, one of the main settings of the show and where they also had numerous sets, was located in Northvale, New Jersey before it was demolished in 2006.
 The Adventures of Pete & Pete, set in the fictional town of Wellesville in an unnamed state, was filmed in New Jersey. Originally, the school scenes were shot in Bayonne and the neighborhood scenes in South Orange, and Leonia. For the third season, production took place in Cranford. The occasional New Jersey Transit Bus or other such object in a shot would occasionally give this fact away.
 NBC's medical drama Mercy is set in the fictional Mercy Hospital in Jersey City. The short-lived hospital drama was filmed at a warehouse in Secaucus, a private residence in Weehawken and a public school in Jersey City.
 The MTV reality show Jersey Shore (TV series) takes place in Seaside Heights, New Jersey as well as other South Jersey locales during seasons 1 and 3.
 Cake Boss
 The CW action-thriller television series Nikita is set in and around New Jersey.
 Wake Up with Marci on CBS owned WLNY-TV 10/55 talk show empowering women url=Awards Winning TV Personality | Host | Show Creator | Executive Producer New Jersey
 Nickelodeon's Rise Of The Teenage Mutant Ninja Turtles often has the main characters (especially Leonardo) slander New Jersey, most notably in "The Evil League Of Mutants" and "Mystic Mayhem".

Motion pictures filmed in New Jersey

Locations

Coyote Ugly was filmed in South Amboy, NJ.
The Family Stone starring Diane Keaton, Sarah Jessica Parker, Amy Adams, Luke Wilson and Craig T. Nelson was filmed on location in Madison, NJ.
 The Great Train Robbery, 1903
 The 1979 film The Amityville Horror was filmed in Toms River and the scene in the church was filmed in Point Pleasant Beach.
 The original Friday the 13th horror movie was filmed at Camp NoBeBoSco in Blairstown as the setting for Camp Crystal Lake.
 The Family Man, starring Nicolas Cage, was filmed in Teaneck in 2000.
 In the 1996 science fiction film Independence Day the scene in which Jeff Goldblum and Judd Hirsch are playing chess was filmed in West New York.
 The title character in The Toxic Avenger is often touted as the first superhero from New Jersey.
 In the 2005 film adaptation of War of the Worlds, the beginning of the movie is set in New Jersey, an homage to the 1938 radio broadcast.
 The film World Trade Center, starring Nicolas Cage, had numerous scenes shot in Glen Rock, New Jersey
 The 2004 film Garden State was set and filmed in New Jersey. It was written, directed and starred in by Zach Braff, who grew up in New Jersey. The film's title refers to the state's nickname.
 Director Kevin Smith's movies have a recurring set of characters (most famously Jay and Silent Bob) who nearly all of come from New Jersey (primarily the "tri-town" area of Atlantic Highlands, Leonardo, and Red Bank). The state appears in all of Smith's films, and his first three films, Clerks, Mallrats and Chasing Amy, were dubbed the "New Jersey Trilogy." The short-lived animated spinoff spawned by Clerks also took place in the same locations as the movie. Smith's subsequent efforts, Dogma, Jersey Girl, Jay and Silent Bob Strike Back, and Clerks II all had scenes taking place in various New Jersey locales.
 The Ron Howard film Cinderella Man and the Elia Kazan film On the Waterfront both take place in the old Hudson County docks.
 Although not credited, at least one scene from The Godfather (1972) was filmed in New Jersey. The scene in which Clemenza states the famous line, "Leave the gun. Take the cannolis," was filmed in the marsh along the Hudson River in Jersey City, just west of the Statue of Liberty, in what is now Liberty State Park.
 Sorcerer (1977), directed by William Friedkin, Stars: Roy Scheider, Bruno Cremer and Francisco Rabal, The beginning scenes of the movie were filmed in Elizabeth, NJ.
 Daddy Warbucks' mansion from the 1982 movie Annie was built in 1929 by Hubert Parson, the president of F.W. Woolworth. He called it Shadow Lawn. Now it is Woodrow Wilson Hall, owned by Monmouth University at West Long Branch, NJ.
 Also in Annie, the raised bridge that Rooster chases Annie up is located in East Newark, NJ.
 The 1982 film The World According to Garp includes a scene that was shot around characters in two cars on the Rutgers main campus in New Brunswick even though the film is set in New England.
 The 1983 film Eddie and the Cruisers was filmed mostly in Somers Point and Ocean City.
 The Adventures of Buckaroo Banzai Across the 8th Dimension (1984) was set in New Brunswick, and includes a scene set in "Greasy Tony's"—a real Rutgers-area eatery.
 The 1988 comedy film Big starring Tom Hanks, was filmed in Cliffside Park.
 The 1989 film Lean on Me took place in Paterson, New Jersey
 Goodfellas, the 1990 Martin Scorsese film about the mob, had some scenes filmed on location in Fort Lee.
 The 1993 film Coneheads was set and filmed in Paramus.
 The 1994 film I.Q., about Albert Einstein's attempt to play matchmaker for his niece, was filmed in Princeton, Lawrenceville, Cranbury, and Rocky Hill.
 Although depicting Newark's notorious car theft rate, the 1995 film New Jersey Drive was shot in East Orange, Elizabeth, and Paterson, as well as Brooklyn, Harlem, and Queens, New York.
 The 1997 film Big Night was shot in the bayshore towns of Keyport and Keansburg.
 The film Cop Land (1997) was filmed in Fort Lee, Cliffside Park, Teaneck and Edgewater. 
 The 1998 film One True Thing, starring Meryl Streep, Renée Zellweger, and William Hurt, was filmed in the towns of Maplewood, Morristown, and at Princeton University.
 2001's A Beautiful Mind had several scenes shot at both Princeton University and Fairleigh Dickinson University (Madison campus). The movie is a biopic of the mathematician John Nash, who resided in Princeton, New Jersey until his death in 2015.
 Although supposedly set in New York City, the 2003 movie School of Rock was filmed primarily in Edison and Mahwah, perhaps due to the significance these towns have on rock music.
 The 2004 Sundance Film Festival favorite Garden State (starring Zach Braff and Natalie Portman) was shot on location in Maplewood and South Orange.
 The 2004 stoner film Harold & Kumar Go to White Castle took place in New Jersey. Several locations seen in the movie include Princeton University, Newark, New Brunswick, and a fictional White Castle in Cherry Hill.
 The movie War of the Worlds was filmed in many locations in New Jersey, including Bayonne, Howell Township and Newark. The infamous radio show broadcast starring Orson Welles, The War of the Worlds was set in Grover's Mill (a section of West Windsor Township) and other locations around New Jersey.
 The film The Wrestler took place in Elizabeth, New Jersey and was filmed throughout there and the rest of the state. 
 The film The Wedding Singer starring Adam Sandler and Drew Barrymore takes place in Ridgefield, New Jersey.  The Broadway Musical of the same title starring Stephen Lynch as Robbie Hart and Laura Benanti as Julia Sullivan also takes place in Ridgefield.
 The film The Station Agent was filmed and took place in Newfoundland, New Jersey.
 Be Kind Rewind took place in Passaic, New Jersey.
 The Hurricane (1999 film), various locations including East Jersey State Prison and Hudson County Courthouse
 The online web-series "EverymanHYBRID" is set and produced prominently in and around Hamilton and Princeton, NJ.
 At the beginning of the 2010 film Morning Glory, Rachel McAdams' character is the producer of fictional morning show Good Morning New Jersey, filmed at MediaMix Studios in Allendale, New Jersey.
 tráfico an TV series about human trafficking in the United States is shot in Roselle, NJ, www.trafico-series.tv
Radium Girls (2018)
 The short film Meet Me in the Ironbound was filmed on location at numerous Newark locations.

Studio complexes

The floor space and height of the Jersey City Armory has led to its use as a temporary studio for many projects, including Robert De Niro's A Bronx Tale, the Faye Dunaway thriller Eyes Of Laura Mars, Laura Brannigan's music video "Self-Control", Woody Allen's Deconstructing Harry, Terry Kinney's Diminished Capacity, and A Perfect Murder by Andrew Davis.

In 2010, a new Studio City New Jersey was opened in Trenton.
and in 2011, the Ironbound Film and Television Studio was opened in Newark.

After the new tax credit took effect, some major studio developments started to take shape. After the closure of the Meadowlands Arena as a sports and entertainment venue, NBC leased the space and converted it to a major film studio in 2019.

In September 2019 it was announced that the Criterion Group would convert a warehouse in Jersey City to the state's largest film studio named Caven Point Studios. In 2020, Criterion Group partnered with One Stop Properties to purchase two near by warehouse properties next to Liberty State Park to create three soundstages and office spaces called Cinelease Studios. In February 2021, Palisade Stages opened its 23,000 square feet studio in Kearny. Supor Studio City in Harrison was converted from seven existing buildings into studios. Another studio opened on Kearny Point in 2022, 10 Basin Studios.

As of 2021, other studio development projects are being considered in Bayonne, Jersey City, Linden, Newark, Malaga and Atlantic City.

There have been a few proposals for large studio construction projects in New Jersey. In October 2021, Netflix announced its intention to bid for a redevelopment of a 289-acre parcel at Fort Monmouth to turn it into Netflix's second-largest production complex. In March 2022, Township of West Orange announced a partnership with, a studio design and development company, MBS Group, to redevelop properties adjacent to Thomas Edison's Laboratory to build up to eight sound studios. Also in the same month, the construction of a major studio at Bergen Point was announced. Called 1888 Studios, it will be the largest in New Jersey.

In 2022, the city of Newark announced that a major new film and television production studio overlooking Weequahic Park and Weequahic Golf Course, to be called "Lionsgate Newark," would open in 2024 on the 15-acre former Seth Boyden Terrace housing project site at 101 Center Terrace in the Dayton section of the city near Evergreen Cemetery. Lionsgate Newark will partner on public relations and community affairs with the New Jersey Performing Arts Center.

Film festivals
 Black Maria Film Festival
Garden State Film Festival
Golden Door Film Festival
Hoboken International Film Festival
 Newark Black Film Festival
 Newark International Film Festival
 NJ Jewish Film Festival
 Montclair Film Festival
 Asbury Park Music and Film Festival
 Cranford Film Festival

See also
 Passaic: Birthplace of Television and the DuMont Story
 List of movies based on location
 New Jersey Film Festival
 List of people from New Jersey
 View Askewniverse
 List of festivals in New Jersey

References

External links
 New Jersey Motion Picture & Television Commission
 Fort Lee Film Commission

New Jersey culture
Films shot in New Jersey
New Jersey
Economy of New Jersey
Mass media in New Jersey